Miconia penningtonii is a species of plant in the family Melastomataceae. It is endemic to Ecuador. Its natural habitats are subtropical or tropical moist montane forests and subtropical or tropical high-altitude grassland.

References

penningtonii
Endemic flora of Ecuador
Vulnerable flora of South America
Taxonomy articles created by Polbot